Buades is a family name of Spanish origin. Notable people with the surname include:

 Abel Buades (born 1977), Spanish footballer
 Lucas Buadés (born 1997), French footballer
 Miquel Buades (born 1980), Spanish footballer

See also
 Buade (disambiguation)

Surnames of Spanish origin